Glafcos Ioannou Clerides (24 April 1919 – 15 November 2013) was a Greek Cypriot politician and barrister who served as the fourth president of Cyprus from 1993 to 2003. At the time of his death, he was the oldest living former President of Cyprus.

Personal life
Clerides was born in Nicosia. He was the eldest son of the lawyer and statesman Ioannis Clerides and Elli Argyridou. He had one sister, Chrysanthi, and one brother, Xanthos. Clerides married Lila Erulkar (31 October 1921 – 6 June 2007), the Indian Jewish daughter of Abraham Erulkar, personal physician to Mahatma Gandhi, in London in 1947. They have a daughter, Katherine (born 1949 in London), who was a member of the House of the Representatives for the Democratic Rally Party.  He died on 15 November 2013 at a hospital in Nicosia.

World War II
During World War II, he served in the British Royal Air Force. In 1942 his airplane was shot down over Germany and he was captured. He remained a prisoner of war until the end of the war. His name was mentioned in dispatches for distinguished services.

Post-World War II
Following the war, he studied law at King's College London graduated in 1948 as a barrister through Gray's Inn, and later practiced law in Cyprus. He was a member of the EOKA organization that sought the liberation of Cyprus from British Rule and participated in the struggle under the pseudonym "Ypereides." During that period he defended numerous EOKA fighters arrested by the British. One of his most famous accomplishments was a preparation of a dossier that enumerated and provided evidence of instances of Human Rights violations by the Imperial administration of Cyprus and its agents.

Cypriot independence
Clerides participated in the 1959 London Conference on Cyprus and during the transitional period, from colonial administration to independence (1959–1960), he served as Minister of Justice. During the same period he was Head of the Greek Cypriot delegation in the Joint Constitutional Committee. In July 1960, he was elected to the House of Representatives which, in turn, elected him as its first President. He held this position until 22 July 1976. In the first presidential elections Clerides backed Makarios III, the other candidate being his father Ioannis Clerides.

Cyprus became independent in 1960, and Clerides gained political power as a member of the United Democratic Party. Following the 15 July 1974 coup d'état in which EOKA B, a Greek Cypriot pro-enosis paramilitary organisation, overthrew the democratically elected Makarios and installed Nikos Sampson as a President with dictatorial powers, Turkey invaded Cyprus. Eight days later, Sampson was forced to resign.  On the same day, 23 July 1974, Clerides temporarily assumed the duties of the President of the Republic, in accordance with the relevant provisions of the Constitution. He exercised these duties until 7 December 1974, the day of the return of Archbishop Makarios, President of the Republic, who was forced to flee on 16 July 1974 on account of the coup. Both President Makarios and the House of Representatives thanked Glafcos Clerides publicly for the task he performed during that period. Critics, especially from EDEK refer to that period as the post-coup, implying that democracy was not fully restored until the return of Makarios. Clerides on the other hand has repeatedly condemned what he called "violence and counter violence" that led to the coup (i.e. the conflict between EOKA-B and "Efedriko", a special paramilitary police body formed to fight EOKA-B).

Post-independence
From 1959 to 1960 he held the position of President of the Cyprus Red Cross. In recognition of his outstanding services he was awarded a Certificate of Honour and Life Membership in recognition of distinguished services to the Red Cross.

In 1976 he founded the right wing Democratic Rally (Demokratikos Synagermos). He was a candidate for the presidency of Cyprus six times and elected to two five-year terms, in 1993 and in 1998. In 1998 his main opponent was Georgios Iakovou. He was defeated in the 2003 presidential election by Tassos Papadopoulos.

He was the author of the autobiographical overtoned depiction of 20th century Cypriot history, My Deposition, in four volumes (Alithia Publishing, Cyprus, 1988). Glafcos Clerides is an Honorary Member of the International Raoul Wallenberg Foundation.

Presidency of Cyprus
During his presidency (1993–2003) Cyprus prospered significantly. Cyprus' stable economy made the island the wealthiest of the ten countries which acceded to the European Union in 2004. The Clerides government is credited with the accession of Cyprus to the European Union. He lost some of his popularity due to his strong support of the Annan Plan for the reunification of Cyprus. While 65% of the Turkish Cypriot community later voted in favor of the plan in a referendum held in 2004, the Greek Cypriot community rejected it by over 75% of the popular vote.

Honours and awards
 : Knight of the Collar of the Order of the Holy Sepulchre
 : Grand Cross of the Order of the Redeemer

References

Bibliography
 Niyazi Kızılyürek, Glafkos Clerides: The Path of a Country, Rimal Publications, Nicosia, 2008, 278 p.

External links
 Biography 

1919 births
2013 deaths
Alumni of King's College London
Members of Gray's Inn
20th-century presidents of Cyprus
21st-century presidents of Cyprus
20th-century Cypriot writers
Cypriot people of the EOKA
Cypriot biographers
20th-century Cypriot lawyers
Cypriot political writers
Leaders of political parties in Cyprus
Presidents of the House of Representatives (Cyprus)
20th-century memoirists
People educated at Pancyprian Gymnasium
People from Nicosia
Royal Air Force personnel of World War II
World War II prisoners of war held by Germany
Democratic Rally politicians